The 2009 Los Angeles Angels of Anaheim season was the franchise's 49th season. The Angels began the season as the two-time defending American League West division champions.

Perhaps the most notable player to depart in the offseason due to free agency was longtime closing pitcher Francisco Rodríguez, who signed with the New York Mets. Other notable free agent departures were 2008 acquisitions Jon Garland (Arizona Diamondbacks) and Mark Teixeira (New York Yankees). Notable free agent acquisitions included new closer Brian Fuentes, previously of the Colorado Rockies, and Bobby Abreu, previously of the Yankees.

Tragedy struck the Angels twice this season. Preston Gómez, the team's special assistant to the general manager, died January 13 of injuries sustained when he was struck by a car in Blythe, California, on March 26, 2008. As a tribute, the Angels began the season wearing black "PRESTON" patches on their left sleeve. Then, on April 9, rookie pitcher Nick Adenhart was killed in a car accident in Fullerton, California, hours after pitching 6 shutout innings against the Oakland Athletics in his first start of the season. As a tribute, the Angels continued to assign a locker to Adenhart at home and on the road, hang a jersey with his name and number in their dugout, and wear black patches with his name and number on their left breast for the rest of the season.

On September 28, the Angels clinched the American League West division title, their eighth in franchise history.

Regular season

Season standings

Record vs. opponents

Roster

Game log 

 !! Stadium !! Box !! GB
|- align="center" bgcolor="bbffbb"
| 1 || April 6 || Athletics || 3–0 || Saunders (1–0) || Braden (0–1) || Fuentes (1) || 43,220 || 1–0 || Angel Stadium of Anaheim || W1 || bgcolor="f2f2f2" | 0
|- align="center" bgcolor="ffbbbb"
| 2 || April 7 || Athletics || 6–4 || Wuertz (1–0) || Jepsen (0–1) || Ziegler (1) || 43,396 || 1–1 || Angel Stadium of Anaheim || L1 || bgcolor="ffbbbb" | -½
|- align="center" bgcolor="ffbbbb"
| 3 || April 8 || Athletics || 6–4 || Bailey (1–0) || Fuentes (0–1) || Ziegler (2) || 43,283 || 1–2 || Angel Stadium of Anaheim || L2 || bgcolor="ffbbbb" | -1½
|- align="center" bgcolor="bbbbbb"
| || April 9 || Athletics || colspan=5 |Postponed (death of P Nick Adenhart); rescheduled for August 27 || 1–2 || Angel Stadium of Anaheim || || bgcolor="ffbbbb" | -2
|- align="center" bgcolor="bbffbb"
| 4 || April 10 || Red Sox || 6–3 || Weaver (1–0) || Wakefield (0–1) || Shields (1) || 41,385 || 2–2 || Angel Stadium of Anaheim || W1 || bgcolor="ffbbbb" | -1
|- align="center" bgcolor="ffbbbb"
| 5 || April 11 || Red Sox || 5–4 || Penny (1–0) || Saunders (1–1) || Papelbon (2) || 40,163 || 2–3 || Angel Stadium of Anaheim || L1 || bgcolor="ffbbbb" | -1½
|- align="center" bgcolor="bbffbb"
| 6 || April 12 || Red Sox || 5–4 || Moseley (1–0) || Beckett (1–1) || Fuentes (2) || 38,076 || 3–3 || Angel Stadium of Anaheim || W1 || bgcolor="ffbbbb" | -1½
|- align="center" bgcolor="ffbbbb"
| 7 || April 14 || @ Mariners || 3–2 (10) || Corcoran (1–0) || Shields (0–1) || || 45,958 || 3–4 || Safeco Field || L1 || bgcolor="ffbbbb" | -2½
|- align="center" bgcolor="ffbbbb"
| 8 || April 15 || @ Mariners || 11–3 || Washburn (2–0) || Weaver (1–1) || || 18,516 || 3–5 || Safeco Field || L2 || bgcolor="ffbbbb" | -3½
|- align="center" bgcolor="bbffbb"
| 9 || April 16 || @ Mariners || 5–1 || Saunders (2–1) || Jakubauskas (1–1) || || 18,528 || 4–5 || Safeco Field || W1 || bgcolor="ffbbbb" | -2½
|- align="center" bgcolor="ffbbbb"
| 10 || April 17 || @ Twins || 11–9 || Guerrier (1–0) || Bulger (0–1) || Nathan (2) || 24,168 || 4–6 || HHH Metrodome || L1 || bgcolor="ffbbbb" | -3½
|- align="center" bgcolor="ffbbbb"
| 11 || April 18 || @ Twins || 9–2 || Slowey (2–0) || Jepsen (0–2) || || 34,286 || 4–7 || HHH Metrodome || L2 || bgcolor="ffbbbb" | -3½
|- align="center" bgcolor="ffbbbb"
| 12 || April 19 || @ Twins || 3–1 || Perkins (1–1) || Loux (0–1) || Nathan (3) || 28,302 || 4–8 || HHH Metrodome || L3 || bgcolor="ffbbbb" | -3½
|- align="center" bgcolor="bbffbb"
| 13 || April 21 || Tigers || 4–3 || Arredondo (1–0) || Lyon (1–2) || Fuentes (3) || 41,627 || 5–8 || Angel Stadium of Anaheim || W1 || bgcolor="ffbbbb" | -3½
|- align="center" bgcolor="ffbbbb"
| 14 || April 22 || Tigers || 12–10 || Rincón (1–0) || Shields (0–2) || || 43,047 || 5–9 || Angel Stadium of Anaheim || L1 || bgcolor="ffbbbb" | -3½
|- align="center" bgcolor="bbffbb"
| 15 || April 23 || Tigers || 10–5 || Palmer (1–0) || Jackson (1–1) || || 38,543 || 6–9 || Angel Stadium of Anaheim || W1 || bgcolor="ffbbbb" | -3½
|- align="center" bgcolor="ffbbbb"
| 16 || April 24 || Mariners || 8–3 || Bédard (2–1) || Loux (0–2) || || 43,083 || 6–10 || Angel Stadium of Anaheim || L1 || bgcolor="ffbbbb" | -4½
|- align="center" bgcolor="ffbbbb"
| 17 || April 25 || Mariners || 9–8 || Silva (1–2) || Ortega (0–1) || Aardsma (3) || 43,542 || 6–11 || Angel Stadium of Anaheim || L2 || bgcolor="ffbbbb" | -5½
|- align="center" bgcolor="bbffbb"
| 18 || April 26 || Mariners || 8–0 || Weaver (2–1) || Washburn (3–1) || || 43,057 || 7–11 || Angel Stadium of Anaheim || W1 || bgcolor="ffbbbb" | -4½
|- align="center" bgcolor="bbffbb"
| 19 || April 28 || @ Orioles || 7–5 || Saunders (3–1) || Eaton (1–3) || Fuentes (4) || 11,857 || 8–11 || Oriole Park at Camden Yards || W2 || bgcolor="ffbbbb" | -4
|- align="center" bgcolor="bbffbb"
| 20 || April 29 || @ Orioles || 3–2 || Loux (1–2) || Uehara (2–2) || Fuentes (5) || 14,203 || 9–11 || Oriole Park at Camden Yards || W3 || bgcolor="ffbbbb" | -3
|- align="center" bgcolor="ffbbbb"
| 21 || April 30 || @ Yankees || 7–4 || Coke (1–1) || Speier (0–1) || Rivera (5) || 43,388 || 9–12 || Yankee Stadium || L1 || bgcolor="ffbbbb" | -3½
|-

 !! Stadium !! Box !! GB
|- align="center" bgcolor="ffbbbb"
| 22 || May 1 || @ Yankees || 10–9 || Albaladejo (2–1) || Fuentes (0–2) || || 44,058 || 9–13 || Yankee Stadium || L2 || bgcolor="ffbbbb" | -4½
|- align="center" bgcolor="bbffbb"
| 23 || May 2 || @ Yankees || 8–4 || Palmer (2–0) || Sabathia (1–3) || || 44,970 || 10–13 || Yankee Stadium || W1 || bgcolor="ffbbbb" | -3½
|- align="center" bgcolor="bbbbbb"
| || May 3 || @ Yankees || colspan=4 |Postponed (rain); rescheduled for September 14 || || || Yankee Stadium || || bgcolor="ffbbbb" | -4
|- align="center" bgcolor="bbffbb"
| 24 || May 4 || @ Athletics || 5–2 || Saunders (4–1) || Anderson (0–3) || Fuentes (6) || 10,397 || 11–13 || Oakland-Alameda Coliseum || W2 || bgcolor="ffbbbb" | -3
|- align="center" bgcolor="bbffbb"
| 25 || May 5 || @ Athletics || 5–3 || Loux (2–2) || Braden (3–3) || Fuentes (7) || 13,298 || 12–13 || Oakland-Alameda Coliseum || W3 || bgcolor="ffbbbb" | -2
|- align="center" bgcolor="ffbbbb"
| 26 || May 6 || Blue Jays || 13–1 || Halladay (6–1) || Ortega (0–2) || || 41,123 || 12–14 || Angel Stadium of Anaheim || L1 || bgcolor="ffbbbb" | -2½
|- align="center" bgcolor="bbffbb"
| 27 || May 7 || Blue Jays || 6–1 || Weaver (3–1) || Ray (0–1) || || 41,007 || 13–14 || Angel Stadium of Anaheim || W1 || bgcolor="ffbbbb" | -1½
|- align="center" bgcolor="bbffbb"
| 28 || May 8 || Royals || 4–1 || Palmer (3–0) || Meche (2–3) || Fuentes (8) || 41,019 || 14–14 || Angel Stadium of Anaheim || W2 || bgcolor="ffbbbb" | -1½
|- align="center" bgcolor="bbffbb"
| 29 || May 9 || Royals || 1–0 || Saunders (5–1) || Greinke (6–1) || || 39,776 || 15–14 || Angel Stadium of Anaheim || W3 || bgcolor="ffbbbb" | -½
|- align="center" bgcolor="bbffbb"
| 30 || May 10 || Royals || 4–3 || Shields (1–2) || Wright (0–1) || Fuentes (9) || 43,646 || 16–14 || Angel Stadium of Anaheim || W4 || bgcolor="ffbbbb" | -½
|- align="center" bgcolor="ffbbbb"
| 31 || May 12 || Red Sox || 4–3 || R. Ramírez (4–0) || Shields (1–3) || Papelbon (9) || 33,411 || 16–15 || Angel Stadium of Anaheim || L1 || bgcolor="ffbbbb" | -1½
|- align="center" bgcolor="bbffbb"
| 32 || May 13 || Red Sox || 8–4 || Palmer (4–0) || Wakefield (4–2) || || 35,666 || 17–15 || Angel Stadium of Anaheim || W1 || bgcolor="ffbbbb" | -1½
|- align="center" bgcolor="bbffbb"
| 33 || May 14 || Red Sox || 5–4 (12) || Bulger (1–1) || Delcarmen (1–1) || || 35,124 || 18–15 || Angel Stadium of Anaheim || W2 || bgcolor="ffbbbb" | -1½
|- align="center" bgcolor="ffbbbb"
| 34 || May 15 || @ Rangers || 10–8 || Millwood (4–3) || Saunders (5–2) || Wilson (1) || 33,429 || 18–16 ||| Rangers Ballpark in Arlington || L1 || bgcolor="ffbbbb" | -2½
|- align="center" bgcolor="ffbbbb"
| 35 || May 16 || @ Rangers || 5–3 || Padilla (3–2) || Loux (2–3) || Wilson (2) || 34,284 || 18–17 || Rangers Ballpark in Arlington || L2 || bgcolor="ffbbbb" | -3½
|- align="center" bgcolor="ffbbbb"
| 36 || May 17 || @ Rangers || 3–0 || Jennings (1–1) || Weaver (3–2) || O'Day (1) || 37,146 || 18–18 || Rangers Ballpark in Arlington || L3 || bgcolor="ffbbbb" | -4½
|- align="center" bgcolor="bbffbb"
| 37 || May 18 || @ Mariners || 10–6 || Lackey (1–0) || Washburn (3–3) || || 17,340 || 19–18 || Safeco Field || W1 || bgcolor="ffbbbb" | -4
|- align="center" bgcolor="bbffbb"
| 38 || May 19 || @ Mariners || 6–5 || Palmer (5–0) || Hernández (4–3) || Fuentes (10) || 16,002 || 20–18 || Safeco Field || W2 || bgcolor="ffbbbb" | -3
|- align="center" bgcolor="ffbbbb"
| 39 || May 20 || @ Mariners || 1–0 || Jakubauskas (3–4) || Santana (0–1) || Aardsma (5) || 18,580 || 20–19 || Safeco Field || L1 || bgcolor="ffbbbb" | -3
|- align="center" bgcolor="bbffbb"
| 40 || May 21 || @ Mariners || 3–0 || Saunders (6–2) || Bédard (2–2) || Fuentes (11) || 18,468 || 21–19 || Safeco Field || W1 || bgcolor="ffbbbb" | -2
|- align="center" bgcolor="bbffbb"
| 41 || May 22 || @ Dodgers || 3–1 || Oliver (1–0) || Wade (0–3) || Fuentes (12) || 55,053 || 22–19 || Dodger Stadium || W2 || bgcolor="ffbbbb" | -2
|- align="center" bgcolor="ffbbbb"
| 42 || May 23 || @ Dodgers || 5–4 (10) || Broxton (5–0) || Arredondo (1–1) || || 55,301 || 22–20 || Dodger Stadium || L1 || bgcolor="ffbbbb" | -3
|- align="center" bgcolor="bbffbb"
| 43 || May 24 || @ Dodgers || 10–7 || Bulger (2–1) || Billingsley (6–2) || || 54,122 || 23–20 || Dodger Stadium || W1 || bgcolor="ffbbbb" | -3
|- align="center" bgcolor="ffbbbb"
| 44 || May 25 || White Sox || 17–3 || Danks (4–3) || Santana (0–2) || || 43,177 || 23–21 || Angel Stadium of Anaheim || L1 || bgcolor="ffbbbb" | -3
|- align="center" bgcolor="ffbbbb"
| 45 || May 26 || White Sox || 4–2 || Colón (3–4) || Saunders (6–3) || Linebrink (1) || 38,040 || 23–22 || Angel Stadium of Anaheim || L2 || bgcolor="ffbbbb" | -4
|- align="center" bgcolor="bbffbb"
| 46 || May 27 || White Sox || 3–1 || Weaver (4–2) || Floyd (3–5) || Fuentes (13) || 40,169 || 24–22 || Angel Stadium of Anaheim || W1 || bgcolor="ffbbbb" | -3
|- align="center" bgcolor="ffbbbb"
| 47 || May 29 || Mariners || 5–2 || Vargas (2–0) || Lackey (1–1) || Aardsma (7) || 38,492 || 24–23 || Angel Stadium of Anaheim || L1 || bgcolor="ffbbbb" | -4½
|- align="center" bgcolor="ffbbbb"
| 48 || May 30 || Mariners || 4–3 (10) || Batista (3–1) || Arredondo (1–2) || Aardsma (8) || 39,329 || 24–24 || Angel Stadium of Anaheim || L2 || bgcolor="ffbbbb" | -5½
|- align="center" bgcolor="bbffbb"
| 49 || May 31 || Mariners || 9–8 || Speier (1–1) || Aardsma (1–2) || || 38,632 || 25–24 || Angel Stadium of Anaheim || W1 || bgcolor="ffbbbb" | -4½
|-

 !! Stadium !! Box !! GB
|- align="center" bgcolor="ffbbbb"
| 50 || June 2 || @ Blue Jays || 6–4 || Halladay (9–1) || Saunders (6–4) || || 26,809 || 25–25 || Rogers Centre || L1 || bgcolor="ffbbbb" | -4½
|- align="center" bgcolor="bbffbb"
| 51 || June 3 || @ Blue Jays || 8–1 || Weaver (5–2) || Janssen (1–2) || || 17,127 || 26–25 || Rogers Centre || W1 || bgcolor="ffbbbb" | -4½
|- align="center" bgcolor="bbffbb"
| 52 || June 4 || @ Blue Jays || 6–5 || Speier (2–1) || League (1–2) || Fuentes (14) || 31,163 || 27–25 || Rogers Centre || W2 || bgcolor="ffbbbb" | -3½
|- align="center" bgcolor="bbffbb"
| 53 || June 5 || @ Tigers || 2–1 || Santana (1–2) || Rodney (0–1) || Fuentes (15) || 31,187 || 28–25 || Comerica Park || W3 || bgcolor="ffbbbb" | -3½
|- align="center" bgcolor="ffbbbb"
| 54 || June 6 || @ Tigers || 2–1 || Jackson (6–3) || Escobar (0–1) || || 32,367 || 28–26 || Comerica Park || L1 || bgcolor="ffbbbb" | -3½
|- align="center" bgcolor="ffbbbb"
| 55 || June 7 || @ Tigers || 9–6 || Zumaya (2–0) || Arredondo (1–3) || || 32,074 || 28–27 || Comerica Park || L2 || bgcolor="ffbbbb" | -4½
|- align="center" bgcolor="bbffbb"
| 56 || June 9 || @ Rays || 4–3 || Weaver (6–2) || Shields (5–5) || Fuentes (16) || 16,087 || 29–27 || Tropicana Field || W1 || bgcolor="ffbbbb" | -3
|- align="center" bgcolor="ffbbbb"
| 57 || June 10 || @ Rays || 9–5 || Cormier (1–1) || Lackey (1–2) || || 15,658 || 29–28 || Tropicana Field || L1 || bgcolor="ffbbbb" | -3½
|- align="center" bgcolor="ffbbbb"
| 58 || June 11 || @ Rays || 11–1 || Balfour (3–1) || Santana (1–3) || || 17,086 || 29–29 || Tropicana Field || L2 || bgcolor="ffbbbb" | -4½
|- align="center" bgcolor="bbffbb"
| 59 || June 12 || Padres || 11–6 || Palmer (6–0) || Gaudin (2–5) || || 41,597 || 30–29 || Angel Stadium of Anaheim || W1 || bgcolor="ffbbbb" | -4½
|- align="center" bgcolor="bbffbb"
| 60 || June 13 || Padres || 9–1 || Saunders (7–4) || Geer (1–2) || || 43,233 || 31–29 || Angel Stadium of Anaheim || W2 || bgcolor="ffbbbb" | -3½
|- align="center" bgcolor="bbffbb"
| 61 || June 14 || Padres || 6–0 || Weaver (7–2) || Young (4–6) || || 40,163 || 32–29 || Angel Stadium of Anaheim || W3 || bgcolor="ffbbbb" | -3½
|- align="center" bgcolor="bbffbb"
| 62 || June 15 || @ Giants || 9–7 || Lackey (2–2) || Zito (3–7) || Fuentes (17) || 33,613 || 33–29 || AT&T Park || W4 || bgcolor="ffbbbb" | -2½
|- align="center" bgcolor="bbffbb"
| 63 || June 16 || @ Giants || 8–1 || O'Sullivan (1–0) || Sánchez (2–7) || || 34,716 || 34–29 || AT&T Park || W5 || bgcolor="ffbbbb" | -2
|- align="center" bgcolor="bbffbb"
| 64 || June 17 || @ Giants || 4–3 || Jepsen (1–2) || Lincecum (6–2) || Fuentes (18) || 37,431 || 35–29 || AT&T Park || W6 || bgcolor="ffbbbb" | -2
|- align="center" bgcolor="bbffbb"
| 65 || June 19 || Dodgers || 5–4 || Speier (3–1) || Mota (3–2) || Fuentes (19) || 44,222 || 36–29 || Angel Stadium of Anaheim || W7 || bgcolor="ffbbbb" | -½
|- align="center" bgcolor="ffbbbb"
| 66 || June 20 || Dodgers || 6–4 || Jeff Weaver (4–1) || Weaver (7–3) || || 44,148 || 36–30 || Angel Stadium of Anaheim || L1 || bgcolor="ffbbbb" | -½
|- align="center" bgcolor="ffbbbb"
| 67 || June 21 || Dodgers || 5–3 || Kershaw (4–5) || Lackey (2–3) || Broxton (17) || 43,891 || 36–31 || Angel Stadium of Anaheim || L2 || bgcolor="ffbbbb" | -½
|- align="center" bgcolor="ffbbbb"
| 68 || June 22 || Rockies || 11–1 || Cook (7–3) || Palmer (6–1) || || 39,557 || 36–32 || Angel Stadium of Anaheim || L3 || bgcolor="ffbbbb" | -1
|- align="center" bgcolor="bbffbb"
| 69 || June 23 || Rockies || 4–3 || Jepsen (2–2) || Jiménez (6–7) || Fuentes (20) || 42,233 || 37–32 || Angel Stadium of Anaheim || W1 || bgcolor="f2f2f2" | 0
|- align="center" bgcolor="bbffbb"
| 70 || June 24 || Rockies || 11–3 || Saunders (8–4) || Marquis (9–5) || || 43,551 || 38–32 || Angel Stadium of Anaheim || W2 || bgcolor="f2f2f2" | 0
|- align="center" bgcolor="bbffbb"
| 71 || June 26 || @ Diamondbacks || 12–3 || Weaver (8–3) || Buckner (2–5) || || 24,870 || 39–32 || Chase Field || W3 || bgcolor="ffbbbb" | -½
|- align="center" bgcolor="bbffbb"
| 72 || June 27 || @ Diamondbacks || 2–1 || Oliver (2–0) || Qualls (1–1) || Fuentes (21) || 27,742 || 40–32 || Chase Field || W4 || bgcolor="bbffbb" | +½
|- align="center" bgcolor="bbffbb"
| 73 || June 28 || @ Diamondbacks || 12–8 || Palmer (7–1) || Scherzer (5–5) || || 25,684 || 41–32 || Chase Field || W5 || bgcolor="bbffbb" | +1½
|- align="center" bgcolor="bbffbb"
| 74 || June 29 || @ Rangers || 5–2 || O'Sullivan (2–0) || Padilla (6–4) || Fuentes (22) || 16,985 || 42–32 || Rangers Ballpark in Arlington || W6 || bgcolor="bbffbb" | +2½
|- align="center" bgcolor="ffbbbb"
| 75 || June 30 || @ Rangers || 9–5 || Feldman (6–2) || Saunders (8–5) || || 20,042 || 42–33 || Rangers Ballpark in Arlington || L1 || bgcolor="bbffbb" | +1½
|-

 !! Stadium !! Box !! GB
|- align="center" bgcolor="ffbbbb"
| 76 || July 1 || @ Rangers || 9–7 || Francisco (2–1) || Speier (3–2) || || 27,142 || 42–34 || Rangers Ballpark in Arlington || L2 || bgcolor="bbffbb" | +½
|- align="center" bgcolor="bbffbb"
| 77 || July 2 || Orioles || 5–2 || Lackey (3–3) || Guthrie (6–8) || Fuentes (23) || 39,180 || 43–34 || Angel Stadium of Anaheim || W1 || bgcolor="bbffbb" | +1
|- align="center" bgcolor="ffbbbb"
| 78 || July 3 || Orioles || 6–4 || Hernandez (2–2) || Santana (1–4) || Sherrill (18) || 39,104 || 43–35 || Angel Stadium of Anaheim || L1 || bgcolor="f2f2f2" | 0
|- align="center" bgcolor="bbffbb"
| 79 || July 4 || Orioles || 11–4 || Bulger (3–1) || Báez (4–3) || || 41,764 || 44–35 || Angel Stadium of Anaheim || W1 || bgcolor="f2f2f2" | 0
|- align="center" bgcolor="bbffbb"
| 80 || July 5 || Orioles || 9–6 || Oliver (3–0) || Albers (1–3) || Fuentes (24) || 35,912 || 45–35 || Angel Stadium of Anaheim || W2 || bgcolor="f2f2f2" | 0
|- align="center" bgcolor="bbffbb"
| 81 || July 6 || Rangers || 9–4 || Weaver (9–3) || Millwood (8–6) || || 35,691 || 46–35 || Angel Stadium of Anaheim || W3 || bgcolor="bbffbb" | +1
|- align="center" bgcolor="ffbbbb"
| 82 || July 7 || Rangers || 8–5 || Holland (3–5) || Lackey (3–4) || || 42,088 || 46–36 || Angel Stadium of Anaheim || L1 || bgcolor="f2f2f2" | 0
|- align="center" bgcolor="ffbbbb"
| 83 || July 8 || Rangers || 8–1 || Padilla (7–4) || Santana (1–5) || || 37,364 || 46–37 || Angel Stadium of Anaheim || L2 || bgcolor="ffbbbb" | -1
|- align="center" bgcolor="bbffbb"
| 84 || July 10 || Yankees || 10–6 || Bulger (4–1) || Melancon (0–1) || Fuentes (25) || 44,076 || 47–37 || Angel Stadium of Anaheim || W1 || bgcolor="ffbbbb" | -½
|- align="center" bgcolor="bbffbb"
| 85 || July 11 || Yankees || 14–8 || Weaver (10–3) || Pettitte (8–5) || || 42,602 || 48–37 || Angel Stadium of Anaheim || W2 || bgcolor="bbffbb" | +½
|- align="center" bgcolor="bbffbb"
| 86 || July 12 || Yankees || 5–4 || Lackey (4–4) || Sabathia (8–6) || Fuentes (26) || 41,532 || 49–37 || Angel Stadium of Anaheim || W3 || bgcolor="bbffbb" | +1½
|- align="center" bgcolor="bbcaff"
|colspan="3" bgcolor="#bbcaff"| July 14: All-Star Game (AL wins—Box) || 4–3 || Papelbon (BOS) || Bell (SD) || Rivera (NYY) || 46,760 || || Busch Stadium || colspan=2 | St. Louis, Missouri
|- align="center" bgcolor="bbffbb"
| 87 || July 16 || @ Athletics || 6–2 || Santana (2–3) || Braden (7–8) || Fuentes (27) || 11,113 || 50–37 || Oakland-Alameda Coliseum || W4 || bgcolor="bbffbb" | +2
|- align="center" bgcolor="ffbbbb"
| 88 || July 17 || @ Athletics || 7–3 || Breslow (2–4)|| Saunders (8–6) || || 17,147 || 50–38 || Oakland-Alameda Coliseum || L1 || bgcolor="bbffbb" | +2
|- align="center" bgcolor="bbffbb"
| 89 || July 18 || @ Athletics || 11–6 || Oliver (4–0) || Mazzaro (2–6) || || 16,475 || 51–38 || Oakland-Alameda Coliseum || W1 || bgcolor="bbffbb" | +3
|- align="center" bgcolor="bbffbb"
| 90 || July 19 || @ Athletics || 1–0 (10) || Lackey (5–4) || Bailey (4–2) || Fuentes (28) || 18,539 || 52–38 || Oakland-Alameda Coliseum || W2 || bgcolor="bbffbb" | +3
|- align="center" bgcolor="bbbbbb"
| | || July 20 || @ Royals || colspan=5 |Postponed (rain); rescheduled for July 21 || 52–38 || Kauffman Stadium || || bgcolor="bbffbb" | +2½
|- align="center" bgcolor="bbffbb"
| 91 || July 21 || @ Royals || 8–5 || Santana (3–5) || Ponson (1–6) || Fuentes (29) || N/A || 53–38 || Kauffman Stadium || W3 || bgcolor="bbffbb" | +3
|- align="center" bgcolor="bbffbb"
| 92 || July 21 || @ Royals || 10–2 || O'Sullivan (3–0) || Chen (0–5) || || 23,874 || 54–38 || Kauffman Stadium || W4 || bgcolor="bbffbb" | +3
|- align="center" bgcolor="bbffbb"
| 93 || July 22 || @ Royals || 9–6 || Speier (4–2) || Colón (1–1) || Fuentes (30) || 18,078 || 55–38 || Kauffman Stadium || W5 || bgcolor="bbffbb" | +3
|- align="center" bgcolor="bbffbb"
| 94 || July 23 || Twins || 6–5 (10) || Fuentes (1–2) || Crain (2–4) || || 38,145 || 56–38 || Angel Stadium of Anaheim || W6 || bgcolor="bbffbb" | +3½
|- align="center" bgcolor="bbffbb"
| 95 || July 24 || Twins || 6–3 || Lackey (6–4) || Liriano (4–10) || || 39,272 || 57–38 || Angel Stadium of Anaheim || W7 || bgcolor="bbffbb" | +3½
|- align="center" bgcolor="bbffbb"
| 96 || July 25 || Twins || 11–5 || Palmer (8–1) || Blackburn (8–5) || || 35,922 || 58–38 || Angel Stadium of Anaheim || W8 || bgcolor="bbffbb" | +4½
|- align="center" bgcolor="ffbbbb"
| 97 || July 26 || Twins || 10–1 || Swarzak (3–3) || Santana (3–6) || || 36,386 || 58–39 || Angel Stadium of Anaheim || L1 || bgcolor="bbffbb" | +3½
|- align="center" bgcolor="ffbbbb"
| 98 || July 27 || Indians || 8–6 || Veras (4–1) || Fuentes (1–3) || Wood (14) || 35,371 || 58–40 || Angel Stadium of Anaheim || L2 || bgcolor="bbffbb" | +2½
|- align="center" bgcolor="bbffbb"
| 99 || July 28 || Indians || 7–6 || Palmer (9–1) || Huff (5–5) || Bulger (1) || 43,270 || 59–40 || Angel Stadium of Anaheim || W1 || bgcolor="bbffbb" | +2½
|- align="center" bgcolor="bbffbb"
| 100 || July 29 || Indians || 9–3 || Lackey (7–4) || Laffey (4–3) || || 39,196 || 60–40 || Angel Stadium of Anaheim || W2 || bgcolor="bbffbb" | +3½
|- align="center" bgcolor="bbffbb"
| 101 || July 31 || @ Twins || 11–5 (11) || Jepsen (3–2) || Keppel (0–1) || || 31,767 || 61–40 || HHH Metrodome || W3 || bgcolor="bbffbb" | +3
|-

 !! Stadium !! Box !! GB
|- align="center" bgcolor="bbffbb"
| 102 || August 1 || @ Twins || 11–6 || Saunders (9–6) || Swarzak (3–4) || || 40,828 || 62–40 || HHH Metrodome || W4 || bgcolor="bbffbb" | +4
|- align="center" bgcolor="bbffbb"
| 103 || August 2 || @ Twins || 13–4 || Weaver (11–3) || Perkins (6–7) || || 41,079 || 63–40 || HHH Metrodome || W5 || bgcolor="bbffbb" | +4
|- align="center" bgcolor="ffbbbb"
| 104 || August 4 || @ White Sox || 5–4 || Thornton (6–2) || Jepsen (3–3) || || 30,228 || 63–41 || U.S. Cellular Field || L1 || bgcolor="bbffbb" | +4½
|- align="center" bgcolor="ffbbbb"
| 105 || August 5 || @ White Sox || 6–2 || Floyd (9–6) || O'Sullivan (3–1) || || 32,167 || 63–42 || U.S. Cellular Field || L2 || bgcolor="bbffbb" | +4½
|- align="center" bgcolor="bbffbb"
| 106 || August 6 || @ White Sox || 9–5 || Santana (4–6) || Danks (9–8) || || 27,487 || 64–42 || U.S. Cellular Field || W1 || bgcolor="bbffbb" | +4½
|- align="center" bgcolor="ffbbbb"
| 107 || August 7 || Rangers || 11–6 || Feldman (11–4) || Saunders (9–7) || || 43,624 || 64–43 || Angel Stadium of Anaheim || L1 || bgcolor="bbffbb" | +3½
|- align="center" bgcolor="bbffbb"
| 108 || August 8 || Rangers || 3–2 || Weaver (12–3) || Guardado (1–2) || Fuentes (31) || 37,166 || 65–43 || Angel Stadium of Anaheim || W1 || bgcolor="bbffbb" | +4½
|- align="center" bgcolor="ffbbbb"
| 109 || August 9 || Rangers || 0–7 || Holland (5–7) || Lackey (7–5) || || 35,706 || 65–44 || Angel Stadium of Anaheim || L1 || bgcolor="bbffbb" | +3½
|- align="center" bgcolor="bbffbb"
| 110 || August 10 || Rays || 8–6 || Jepsen (4–3) || Springer (0–2) || Fuentes (32) || 37,388 || 66–44 || Angel Stadium of Anaheim || W1 || bgcolor="bbffbb" | +4
|- align="center" bgcolor="bbffbb"
| 111 || August 11 || Rays || 6–0 || Santana (5–6) || Price (5–5) || || 43,559 || 67–44 || Angel Stadium of Anaheim || W2 || bgcolor="bbffbb" | +5
|- align="center" bgcolor="bbffbb"
| 112 || August 12 || Rays || 10–5 || Bulger (5–1) || Balfour (4–2) || || 37,859 || 68–44 || Angel Stadium of Anaheim || W3 || bgcolor="bbffbb" | +5
|- align="center" bgcolor="ffbbbb"
| 113 || August 14 || @ Orioles || 16–6 || Tillman (1–0) || Weaver (12–4) || || 25,836 || 68–45 || Oriole Park at Camden Yards || L1 || bgcolor="bbffbb" | +4½
|- align="center" bgcolor="bbffbb"
| 114 || August 15 || @ Orioles || 5–1 || Lackey (8–5) || Matusz (1–2) || Fuentes (33) || 28,770 || 69–45 || Oriole Park at Camden Yards || W1 || bgcolor="bbffbb" | +4½
|- align="center" bgcolor="bbffbb"
| 115 || August 16 || @ Orioles || 17–8 (13) || Bulger (6–1) || Bass (5–3) || || 26,529 || 70–45 || Oriole Park at Camden Yards || W2 || bgcolor="bbffbb" | +4½
|- align="center" bgcolor="bbffbb"
| 116 || August 17 || @ Orioles || 8–5 || Santana (6–6) || Hernandez (4–5) || Fuentes (34) || 18,460 || 71–45 || Oriole Park at Camden Yards || W3 || bgcolor="bbffbb" | +4½
|- align="center" bgcolor="bbffbb"
| 117 || August 18 || @ Indians || 5–4 || Bell (1–0) || Carmona (2–7) || Fuentes (35) || 18,341 || 72–45 || Progressive Field || W4 || bgcolor="bbffbb" | +5½
|- align="center" bgcolor="bbffbb"
| 118 || August 19 || @ Indians || 3–0 || Weaver (13–4) || Sowers (4–9) || || 16,868 || 73–45 || Progressive Field || W5 || bgcolor="bbffbb" | +6½
|- align="center" bgcolor="ffbbbb"
| 119 || August 20 || @ Indians || 11–3 || Masterson (4–4) || Lackey (8–6) || || 16,804 || 73–46 || Progressive Field || L1 || bgcolor="bbffbb" | +5½
|- align="center" bgcolor="ffbbbb"
| 120 || August 21 || @ Blue Jays || 5–4 || Rzepczynski (2–3) || O'Sullivan (3–2) || Janssen (1) || 15,993 || 73–47 || Rogers Centre || L2 || bgcolor="bbffbb" | +5½
|- align="center" bgcolor="bbffbb"
| 121 || August 22 || @ Blue Jays || 7–3 || Santana (7–6) || Richmond (6–7) || || 23,235 || 74–47 || Rogers Centre || W1 || bgcolor="bbffbb" | +6½
|- align="center" bgcolor="ffbbbb"
| 122 || August 23 || @ Blue Jays || 8–3 || Romero (11–5) || Bell (1–1) || || 23,935 || 74–48 || Rogers Centre || L1 || bgcolor="bbffbb" | +5½
|- align="center" bgcolor="ffbbbb"
| 123 || August 24 || Tigers || 10–7 || Verlander (14–7) || Weaver (13–5) || Rodney (27) || 38,421 || 74–49 || Angel Stadium of Anaheim || L2 || bgcolor="bbffbb" | +5
|- align="center" bgcolor="ffbbbb"
| 124 || August 25 || Tigers || 5–3 || Washburn (9–7) || Lackey (8–7) || Rodney (28) || 42,970 || 74–50 || Angel Stadium of Anaheim || L3 || bgcolor="bbffbb" | +4
|- align="center" bgcolor="bbffbb"
| 125 || August 26 || Tigers || 4–2 || Saunders (10–7) || Jackson (10–6) || Fuentes (36) || 36,329 || 75–50 || Angel Stadium of Anaheim || W1 || bgcolor="bbffbb" | +5
|- align="center" bgcolor="ffbbbb"
| 126 || August 27 || Athletics || 2–0 || Cahill (7–12) || Santana (7–7) || Bailey (19) || 43,139 || 75–51 || Angel Stadium of Anaheim || L1 || bgcolor="bbffbb" | +4
|- align="center" bgcolor="bbffbb"
| 127 || August 28 || Athletics || 11–7 || Arredondo (2–3) || Ziegler (1–4) || Fuentes (37) || 41,912 || 76–51 || Angel Stadium of Anaheim || W1 || bgcolor="bbffbb" | +5
|- align="center" bgcolor="ffbbbb"
| 128 || August 29 || Athletics || 4–3 || Ziegler (2–4) || Rodríguez (0–1) || Bailey (20) || 43,011 || 76–52 || Angel Stadium of Anaheim || L1 || bgcolor="bbffbb" | +4
|- align="center" bgcolor="bbffbb"
| 129 || August 30 || Athletics || 9–1 || Lackey (9–7) || Anderson (7–10) || || 38,018 || 77–52 || Angel Stadium of Anaheim || W1 || bgcolor="bbffbb" | +5
|- align="center" bgcolor="bbffbb"
| 130 || August 31 || @ Mariners || 10–0 || Saunders (11–7) || French (4–4) || || 18,959 || 78–52 || Safeco Field || W2 || bgcolor="bbffbb" | +6
|-

 !! Stadium !! Box !! GB
|- align="center" bgcolor="ffbbbb"
| 131 || September 1 || @ Mariners || 2–1 || Fister (2–1) || Oliver (4–1) || Aardsma (31) || 18,542 || 78–53 || Safeco Field || L1 || bgcolor="bbffbb" | +4½
|- align="center" bgcolor="ffbbbb"
| 132 || September 2 || @ Mariners || 3–0 || Hernández (14–5) || Kazmir (8–8) || Aardsma (32) || 22,130 || 78–54 || Safeco Field || L2 || bgcolor="bbffbb" | +3½
|- align="center" bgcolor="bbffbb"
| 133 || September 4 || @ Royals || 2–1 || Weaver (14–5) || Wright (1–5) || Fuentes (38) || 17,447 || 79–54 || Kauffman Stadium || W1 || bgcolor="bbffbb" | +3½
|- align="center" bgcolor="bbffbb"
| 134 || September 5 || @ Royals || bgcolor="bbffbb" | 2 – 1 (11) || Jepsen (5–3) || Yabuta (0–1) || Fuentes (39) || 22,628 || 80–54 || Kauffman Stadium || W2 || bgcolor="bbffbb" | +4½
|- align="center" bgcolor="bbffbb"
| 135 || September 6 || @ Royals || 7–2 || Saunders (12–7) || Hochevar (6–9) || || 16,745 || 81–54 || Kauffman Stadium || W3 || bgcolor="bbffbb" | +5½
|- align="center" bgcolor="ffbbbb"
| 136 || September 7 || @ Royals || 6–3 || Davies (7–9) || Santana (7–8) || Soria (22) || 18,453 || 81–55 || Kauffman Stadium || L1 || bgcolor="bbffbb" | +5
|- align="center" bgcolor="bbffbb"
| 137 || September 8 || Mariners || 3 – 2 (10) || Palmer (10–1) || Batista (6–4) || || 37,725 || 82–55 || Angel Stadium of Anaheim || W1 || bgcolor="bbffbb" | +4½
|- align="center" bgcolor="bbffbb"
| 138 || September 9 || Mariners || 6–3 || Weaver (15–5) || Snell (6–10) || Fuentes (40) || 36,340 || 83–55 || Angel Stadium of Anaheim || W2 || bgcolor="bbffbb" | +4½
|- align="center" bgcolor="bbffbb"
| 139 || September 10 || Mariners || 3–0 || Lackey (10–7) || Rowland-Smith (3–3) || || 37,412 || 84–55 || Angel Stadium of Anaheim || W3 || bgcolor="bbffbb" | +5
|- align="center" bgcolor="bbffbb"
| 140 || September 11 || White Sox || 7–1 || Saunders (13–7) || Floyd (11–10) || || 38,375 || 85–55 || Angel Stadium of Anaheim || W4 || bgcolor="bbffbb" | +5½
|- align="center" bgcolor="ffbbbb"
| 141 || September 12 || White Sox || 4 – 3 (10) || Jenks (3–4) || Fuentes (1–4) || Peña (2) ||| 37,390 || 85–56 || Angel Stadium of Anaheim || L1 || bgcolor="bbffbb" | +5½
|- align="center" bgcolor="bbffbb"
| 142 || September 13 || White Sox || 3–2 || Oliver (5–1) || Buehrle (12–8) || Fuentes (41) || 37,512 || 86–56 || Angel Stadium of Anaheim || W1 || bgcolor="bbffbb" | +6
|- align="center" bgcolor="ffbbbb"
| 143 || September 14 || @ Yankees || 5–3 || Hughes (7–3) || Weaver (15–6) || Rivera (40) || 44,701 || 86–57 || Yankee Stadium || L1 || bgcolor="bbffbb" | +6
|- align="center" bgcolor="ffbbbb"
| 144 || September 15 || @ Red Sox || 4–1 || Matsuzaka (2–5) || Lackey (10–8) || || 37,942 || 86–58 || Fenway Park || L2 || bgcolor="bbffbb" | +6
|- align="center" bgcolor="ffbbbb"
| 145 || September 16 || @ Red Sox || 9–8 || Bard (2–1) || Fuentes (1–5) || || 37,706 || 86–59 || Fenway Park || L3 || bgcolor="bbffbb" | +6
|- align="center" bgcolor="bbffbb"
| 146 || September 17 || @ Red Sox || 4–3 || Jepsen (6–3) || Wagner (1–1) || Fuentes (42) || 38,157 || 87–59 || Fenway Park || W1 || bgcolor="bbffbb" | +6½
|- align="center" bgcolor="bbffbb"
| 147 || September 18 || @ Rangers || 2–0 || Kazmir (9–8) || Hunter (8–4) || Fuentes (43) || 34,240 || 88–59 || Rangers Ballpark in Arlington || W2 || bgcolor="bbffbb" | +7½
|- align="center" bgcolor="ffbbbb"
| 148 || September 19 || @ Rangers || 3–2 ||Feldman (17–5) || Weaver (15–7) || Francisco (23) || 46,596 || 88–60 || Rangers Ballpark in Arlington || L1 || bgcolor="bbffbb" | +6½
|- align="center" bgcolor="bbffbb"
| 149 || September 20 || @ Rangers || 10–5 || Lackey (11–8) || Holland (7–12) || || 33,688 || 89–60 || Rangers Ballpark in Arlington || W1 || bgcolor="bbffbb" | +7½
|- align="center" bgcolor="bbffbb"
| 150 || September 21 || Yankees || 5–2 || Saunders (14–7) || Pettitte (13–7) || Fuentes (44) || 38,667 || 90–60 || Angel Stadium of Anaheim || W2 || bgcolor="bbffbb" | +7½
|- align="center" bgcolor="ffbbbb"
| 151 || September 22 || Yankees || 6–5 || Hughes (8–3) || Palmer (10–2) || Rivera (41) || 40,374 || 90–61 || Angel Stadium of Anaheim || L1 || bgcolor="bbffbb" | +7½
|- align="center" bgcolor="ffbbbb"
| 152 || September 23 || Yankees || 3–2 || Burnett (12–9) || Kazmir (9–9) || Rivera (42) || 35,760 || 90–62 || Angel Stadium of Anaheim || L2 || bgcolor="bbffbb" | +6½
|- align="center" bgcolor="ffbbbb"
| 153 || September 25 || Athletics || 3–0 || Gonzalez (6–6) || Weaver (15–8) || Bailey (26) || 43,242 || 90–63 || Angel Stadium of Anaheim || L3 || bgcolor="bbffbb" | +6
|- align="center" bgcolor="ffbbbb"
| 154 || September 26 || Athletics || 15–10 || Breslow (8–7) || Jepsen (6–4) || || 41,014 || 90–64 ||| Angel Stadium of Anaheim || L4 || bgcolor="bbffbb" | +5
|- align="center" bgcolor="bbffbb"
| 155 || September 27 || Athletics || 7–4 || Saunders (15–7) || González (0–4) || Fuentes (45) || 38,718 || 91–64 || Angel Stadium of Anaheim || W1 || bgcolor="bbffbb" | +6
|- align="center" style="background: #007800; color: white"
| 156 || September 28 || Rangers || 11–0 || Santana (8–8) || Hunter (9–5) || || 40,484 || 92–64 || Angel Stadium of Anaheim || W2 || +7
|- align="center" bgcolor="bbffbb"
| 157 || September 29 || Rangers || 5–2 || O'Sullivan (4–2) || Feldman (17–7) || Fuentes (46) || 38,600 || 93–64 || Angel Stadium of Anaheim || W3 || bgcolor="bbffbb" | +8
|- align="center" bgcolor="bbffbb"
| 158 || September 30 || Rangers || 5–0 || Palmer (11–2) || Holland (8–13) || || 40,616 || 94–64 || Angel Stadium of Anaheim || W4 || bgcolor="bbffbb" | +9
|-

 !! Stadium !! Box !! GB
|- align="center" bgcolor="ffbbbb"
| 159 || October 1 || Rangers || 11–3 || Millwood (13–10) || Bell (1–2) || || 38,552 || 94–65 || Angel Stadium of Anaheim || L1 || bgcolor="bbffbb" | +8
|- align="center" bgcolor="bbffbb"
| 160 || October 2 || @ Athletics || 5–2 || Weaver (16–8) || Gonzalez (6–7) || Fuentes (47) || 14,554 || 95–65 || Oakland-Alameda Coliseum || W1 || bgcolor="bbffbb" | +8
|- align="center" bgcolor="bbffbb"
| 161 || October 3 || @ Athletics || 4–2 || Kazmir (10–9) || Eveland (2–4) ||Fuentes (48) || 16,539 || 96–65 || Oakland-Alameda Coliseum || W2 || bgcolor="bbffbb" | +9
|- align="center" bgcolor="bbffbb"
| 162 || October 4 || @ Athletics || 5–3 || Saunders (16–7) || Gray (0–1) || Jepsen (1) || 16,591 || 97–65 || Oakland-Alameda Coliseum || W3 || bgcolor="bbffbb" | +10

Postseason 
With their win on Monday, September 28, 2009, the Angels clinched their third straight American League West championship. Also, at that time, the Angels clinched the second-best record in the American League giving them home field advantage for the American League Division Series. Also, with their win on Tuesday, September 29, 2009, the Angels knocked the Rangers out of contention for the American League Wild Card, therefore, the Angels faced the Boston Red Sox in the Division Series for the third year in a row.

American League Division Series 

The 2009 American League Division Series featured the AL West champion Los Angeles Angels of Anaheim and the Wildcard winner Boston Red Sox. The series began on October 8, 2009, with the Angels winning the first two games at Angel Stadium. On October 11, the series continued to Fenway Park where the Angels had a stunning come-from-behind victory to win 7–6 and sweep the Red Sox. This series marks the first time the Angels have beaten the Red Sox in a postseason series as well as the first postseason sweep for the Angels in franchise history.

American League Championship Series 

The 2009 American League Championship Series featured the AL West champion Los Angeles Angels of Anaheim and the AL East champion New York Yankees. The Yankees won the series 4 games to 2.

Game log 

 !! Stadium !! Box
|- align="center" bgcolor="bbffbb"
| 1 || October 8 || Red Sox || 5–0 || Lackey (1–0) || Lester (0–1) || || 45,070 || 1–0 || Angel Stadium of Anaheim || W1
|- align="center" bgcolor="bbffbb"
| 2 || October 9 || Red Sox || 4–1 || Weaver (1–0) || Beckett (0–1) || Fuentes (1) || 45,223 || 2–0 || Angel Stadium of Anaheim || W2
|- align="center" bgcolor="bbffbb"
| 3 || October 11 || @ Red Sox || 7–6 || Oliver (1–0) || Papelbon (0–1) || Fuentes (2) || 38,704 || 3–0 || Fenway Park || W3
|- align="center bgcolor="bbffbb"
|-

 !! Stadium !! Box
|- align="center" bgcolor="ffbbbb"
| 1 || October 16 || @ Yankees || 4–1 || Sabathia (2–0) || Lackey (1–1) || Rivera (2) || 49,688 || 0–1 || Yankee Stadium || L1
|- align="center" bgcolor="ffbbbb"
| 2 || October 17 || @ Yankees || 4–3 (13) || Robertson (1–0) || Santana (0–1) || || 49,922 || 0–2 || Yankee Stadium || L2
|- align="center" bgcolor="bbffbb"
| 3 || October 19 || Yankees || 5–4 (11) || Santana (1–1) || Aceves (0–1) || || 44,911 || 1–2 || Angel Stadium of Anaheim || W1
|- align="center" bgcolor="ffbbbb"
| 4 || October 20 || Yankees || 10–1 || Sabathia (3–0) || Kazmir (0–1) || || 45,160 || 1–3 || Angel Stadium of Anaheim || L1
|- align="center" bgcolor="bbffbb"
| 5 || October 22 || Yankees || 7–6 || Jepsen (1–0) || Hughes (0–1) || Fuentes (3) || 45,113 || 2–3 || Angel Stadium of Anaheim || W1
|- align="center" bgcolor="bbbbbb"
| | || October 24 || @ Yankees || colspan=4 |Postponed (rain); rescheduled for October 25 || || 2–3 || Yankee Stadium ||
|- align="center" bgcolor="ffbbbb"
| 6 || October 25 || @ Yankees || 5–2 || Pettitte (2–0) || Saunders (0–1) || Rivera (3) || 50,173 || 2–4 || Yankee Stadium || L1

Player stats

Batting 
Note: G = Games played; AB = At bats; R = Runs scored; H = Hits; 2B = Doubles; 3B = Triples; HR = Home runs; RBI = Runs batted in; BB = Walks; AVG = Batting average; SB = Stolen bases

Pitching 
Note: W = Wins; L = Losses; ERA = Earned run average; G = Games pitched; GS = Games started; CG = Complete games; SV = Saves; SVO = Save Opportunities; IP = Innings pitched; R = Runs allowed; ER = Earned runs allowed; BB = Walks allowed

Source:

Farm system 

LEAGUE CHAMPIONS: Orem

References 

 2009 Los Angeles Angels of Anaheim season at Baseball Reference
 

Los Angeles Angels seasons
American League West champion seasons
Los Angeles Angels of Anaheim
Los